Jackson Electric Membership Corporation (abbreviated as Jackson EMC or JEMC) is one of 39 not for profit membership-owned electric cooperatives located in the U.S. state of Georgia with service in the North-East metropolitan Atlanta area. Power is supplied by Constellation Energy and Oglethorpe Power Corporation which supplies generation capacity to most all EMCs in Georgia with the exception of a few supplied by the Tennessee Valley Authority.

History
Jackson EMC was first chartered in 1938 to serve electricity to rural areas of north-east Georgia where investor-owned and municipal utilities did not serve.  Jackson EMC was organized as a result of President Franklin D. Roosevelt's Rural Electrification Administration (REA) as part of the New Deal programs.  President Roosevelt saw the need for rural electrification when traveling through depression-era Georgia on trips to the Little White House in Warm Springs.  Cost of membership in the cooperative was set at 5.00 USD in 1938 and has not changed to the present day.

Service Area
Electric service is provided to parts of 10 counties: Jackson, Gwinnett, Hall, Clarke, Madison, Barrow, Banks, Lumpkin, Oglethorpe, Franklin

References

Cooperatives in the United States
Electric cooperatives of the United States
1938 establishments in Georgia (U.S. state)